In probability theory, an empirical process is a stochastic process that describes the proportion of objects in a system in a given state.
For a process in a discrete state space a population continuous time Markov chain or Markov population model is a process which counts the number of objects in a given state (without rescaling).
In mean field theory, limit theorems (as the number of objects becomes large) are considered and generalise the central limit theorem for empirical measures. Applications of the theory of empirical processes arise in non-parametric statistics.

Definition
For X1, X2, ... Xn independent and identically-distributed random variables in R with common cumulative distribution function F(x), the empirical distribution function is defined by

where IC is the indicator function of the set C.

For every (fixed) x, Fn(x) is a sequence of random variables which converge to F(x) almost surely by the strong law of large numbers. That is, Fn converges to F pointwise. Glivenko and Cantelli strengthened this result by proving uniform convergence of Fn to F by the Glivenko–Cantelli theorem.

A centered and scaled version of the empirical measure is the signed measure

It induces a map on measurable functions f given by

By the central limit theorem,  converges in distribution to a normal random variable N(0, P(A)(1 − P(A))) for fixed measurable set A. Similarly, for a fixed function f,  converges in distribution to a normal random variable , provided that  and  exist.

Definition

A significant result in the area of empirical processes is Donsker's theorem. It has led to a study of Donsker classes: sets of functions with the useful property that empirical processes indexed by these classes converge weakly to a certain Gaussian process. While it can be shown that Donsker classes are Glivenko–Cantelli classes, the converse is not true in general.

Example
As an example, consider empirical distribution functions. For real-valued iid random variables X1, X2, ..., Xn they are given by

In this case, empirical processes are indexed by a class  It has been shown that  is a Donsker class, in particular,

See also
Khmaladze transformation
Weak convergence of measures
Glivenko–Cantelli theorem

References

Further reading

External links
 Empirical Processes: Theory and Applications, by David Pollard, a textbook available online.
 Introduction to Empirical Processes and Semiparametric Inference, by Michael Kosorok, another textbook available online.

 
Nonparametric statistics